Marine Corps Base Hawaii (MCBH), formerly Marine Corps Air Station Kaneohe Bay and originally Naval Air Station Kaneohe Bay, is a U.S. Marine Corps facility and air station located on the Mokapu Peninsula of windward O'ahu in the City & County of Honolulu.  Marine Corps Base Hawaii is home to Marines, Sailors, their family members, and civilian employees. The United States Marine Corps operates a  runway at the base.

MCBH is home for the 3rd Marine Littoral Regiment, Marine Aircraft Group 24, Combat Logistics Company 33 (CLC-33), 3rd Radio Battalion, and the Navy's Patrol and Reconnaissance Wing 2.

The base lies between the two largest windward O'ahu communities of Kailua and Kāne'ohe, and the main gate is reached at the eastern end of Interstate H-3. The main access to the base is by either H-3 or Mokapu Road. Two areas of the base are classified as conservation land, including the Ulupa'U Crater area (northeast peninsula) and the Nu'upia Pond area (at the Mokapu Road).

History

In 1918, President Woodrow Wilson designated  of land on Mokapu Peninsula for the military. The Kuwaahoe Military Reservation, became known later, in 1942 as Fort Hase. In 1941, Army artillery units moved into the area. In 1939, the Navy constructed a small seaplane base and upon its completion, Naval Air Station Kaneohe Bay's role was expanded to include the administration of the Kaneohe Bay Naval Defense Sea Area.

Attack on Pearl Harbor

On 7 December 1941, Naval Air Station Kaneohe Bay was attacked approximately 9 minutes before the attack on Pearl Harbor.

Post World War II
In 1951, the Marines assumed control of the air station activities when naval aviation moved to Barbers Point Naval Air Station. On 15 January 1952, Marine Corps Air Station Kaneohe Bay was commissioned. On 15 April 1994, the Marine Corps consolidated all of its installations in Hawaii.  MCAS Kaneohe Bay, Camp H. M. Smith, Molokai Training Support Facility, Manana Family Housing Area, Puuloa Range, and the Pearl City Warehouse Annex combined to form a new command, the Marine Corps Base Hawaii, headquartered at MCBH Kaneohe Bay.

All U.S. military units located in Hawaii fall under the command of the U.S. Indo-Pacific Command (USINDOPACOM) which is headquartered at Camp H. M. Smith on Oahu. The Commanding General of Marine Forces Pacific (MARFORPAC) also commands 12 Marine Corps bases and stations in Arizona, California, Hawaii, and Japan, operational forces in Hawaii and Okinawa Prefecture, and units deployed to Southeast/west Asia.

In 2010, parts of the movie Battleship were filmed aboard MCBH.

Geography
According to the United States Census Bureau, the base has a total area of 5.8 square miles (15.1 km²), of which 4.4 square miles (11.4 km²) is land and 1.4 square miles (3.7 km²), or 24.74%, is water.

Demographics

For census purposes, the area is demarcated as the Kaneohe Base census-designated place (CDP), with a population at the 2020 Census of 9,483. The CDP was formerly known as Kaneohe Station.

2020 census

2000 Census
As of the 2000 census, there were 11,827 people, 2,332 households, and 2,283 families residing on the base.  The population density was 2,696.2 people per square mile (1,040.2/km2).  There were 2,388 housing units at an average density of 544.4/sq mi (210.0/km2).  The racial makeup of the base was 66.6% White, 12.1% African American, 1.1% Native American, 5.3% Asian, 1.2% Pacific Islander, 7.6% from other races, and 6.1% from two or more races.  14.6% of the population were Hispanic or Latino of any race. For every 100 women, there were 202.6 men.  For every 100 women age 18 and over, there were 258.8 men. The median income for a household on the base was $34,757.

Education
The Hawaii Department of Education operates Mokapu Elementary School on the MCBH property.  its enrollment was about 900, making it the largest school by enrollment on the Windward side of the island.

Renewable energy and "green" initiatives
Since 2004, MCBH has partnered with Ocean Power Technologies, Inc. to test the generation of electric power from ocean waves using a "PowerBuoy" wave energy converter, one of the first wave power projects in the U.S.

The Azura wave power device is currently being tested in a 30-meter site at the base.

Marine Corps Base Hawaii, under commanding officer Col. Robert Rice, installed solar water heaters on all base housing units, and on 8 December 2010, was scheduled to debut a "Net Zero" sustainable energy home, which uses solar power. The base fleet of government vehicles is also being changed over to hybrid and electric vehicles and most other "FlexFuel" vehicles now operate on E85 ethanol-based fuel. MCB Hawaii installed the first E85 pump in the state of Hawaii in November 2010, the first U.S. military installation in the world to do so.

See also
 U.S. Army Coast Artillery Corps
 16th Coast Artillery (United States)
 List of United States Marine Corps installations

References

External links

 

Buildings and structures in Honolulu County, Hawaii
Military facilities in Hawaii
Hawaii
Forts in Hawaii
Populated places on Oahu
1918 establishments in Hawaii
Populated coastal places in Hawaii